I.DE.A Institute (acronym, Institute of Development in Automotive Engineering) was an automobile design and engineering company in Turin, Italy, founded in 1978. The Rieter Holding Ltd took full control of the company in 2002. In 2010, Rieter sold the company to the Swiss investment group Quantum Kapital AG.

The company was liquidated in 2019.

Notable work 

 1987 Ferrari 408 4RM
 1988 Fiat Tipo
 1988 Ferrari PPG Indy Pace Car
 1989 Lancia Dedra
 1990 Fiat Tempra
 1992 Alfa Romeo 155
 1992 Grigua and Grigua Off-Road
 1993 Lancia Delta
 1993 Nissan Terrano II/Ford Maverick
 1994 Lancia Kappa
 1995 Daihatsu Move
 1996 Fiat Palio
 1997 Dacia D33
 1997 Daewoo Nubira
 1998 Tata Indica
 2000 Kia Rio
 2002 Tata Indigo
 2004 Fiat Trepiùno (construction only). 
 2008 Tata Nano
 2012 Ssang Yong XIV-1 and XIV-2 in 2012. Concepts for SsangYong Tivoli.

Notable designers
 Ercole Spada

Gallery

Notes

External links 

Coachbuilders of Italy
Italian automobile designers
Companies based in Turin
Design companies established in 1978
Design companies of Italy
Italian companies established in 1978